Ambrosio Montt Luco (December 7, 1830 – February 18, 1899) was a Chilean politician and lawyer.

1830 births
1899 deaths
Ambrosio
People from Santiago
Members of the Chamber of Deputies of Chile
19th-century Chilean lawyers
19th-century Chilean politicians